Tom Morrow (June 3, 1938 – April 4, 2018) was an American football safety who played three years for the Oakland Raiders of the American Football League (AFL). He holds the record for the most consecutive games with an interception, with eight. He played college football at University of Southern Mississippi.

See also
Other American Football League players

1938 births
2018 deaths
Southern Miss Golden Eagles football players
Oakland Raiders players
People from Butler County, Alabama
Players of American football from Alabama
American Football League players